Patriot Party or Patriotic Party may refer to:

United States
 Patriot Party (1970s), in the United States
 Patriot Party (hypothetical United States party), a hypothetical political party proposed by Donald Trump
 United Citizens Party of South Carolina, known as the Patriot Party for part of its history
 White Patriot Party, in the United States (1980–1987)

Canada
 British Columbia Patriot Party, in Canada
 Parti patriote, in Canada

United Kingdom
 Patriot Whigs, in the United Kingdom (1725)
 Patriotic Party (UK) (1964)

Others
 Aruban Patriotic Party
 Belarusian Patriotic Party
 Irish Patriot Party
 National Patriotic Party, in Liberia
 New Patriotic Party, in Ghana
 New Zealand Patriot Party
 Patriot Party (Armenia)
 Patriot Party (Indonesia)
 Patriotic Party, in the Polish–Lithuanian Commonwealth (1788–1792)
 Patriotic Party (Guatemala), in Guatemala
 Patriotic Party (Turkey)
 Patriotic Party of Pridnestrovie, in Transnistria
 Patriotic Renovation Party, in Honduras
 Patriottentijd, in the Netherlands